La'am (lit. For the Nation), acronym of Likud Avoda Mamlakhtit was a political faction in Israel that formed part of Likud between 1976 and 1984.

History
Between its formation in 1973 and formal merger in 1988, Likud consisted of an alliance of several right wing parties. The two largest blocs were Herut and the Liberal Party, which had formed the Gahal alliance between 1965 and 1973. In 1973 the two parties were joined by the Free Centre, the Independent Centre (a breakaway from the Free Centre), the National List and the Movement for Greater Israel.

In 1976, the latter three formed an alliance within the Likud bloc, named La'am, which consisted of eight of Likud's 39 seats. In the 1977 elections La'am remained at eight seats, with Likud growing to 43.

On 15 May 1979, Moshe Shamir, the Movement for Greater Israel representative, left Likud to sit as an independent, later establishing Tehiya with Geula Cohen. On 26 January 1981 three of its members, Yigal Hurvitz, Zalman Shoval and Yitzhak Peretz, left Likud to re-establish the National List as an independent party. Hurvitz and Shoval left to form Telem, whilst Peretz returned to Likud and La'am.

La'am was reduced to five seats from Likud's 48 in the June 1981 elections, following disputes within Likud about the number of seats allocated to each faction in which many Herut members felt the Liberal Party and La'am were over-represented. On 26 October 1982 it was reduced to three seats as Amnon Linn and Peretz defected to the Alignment. However, it gained an extra MK when Avraham Hirschson replaced Liberal faction member Simha Erlich. In 1984, as part of a move to consolidate Likud, La'am merged into Herut. Four years later the Liberal Party and Herut formally merged to leave Likud as a unitary party.

Knesset members

References

Political parties established in 1976
Political parties disestablished in 1984
Defunct political parties in Israel